The Do Meio River is a river of Rio Grande do Sul state in southern Brazil.  It is a tributary of the Uruguay River.

See also
List of rivers of Rio Grande do Sul

References
Brazilian Ministry of Transport

Rivers of Rio Grande do Sul